Pleurothallis atrohiata is an orchid species, part of the genus Pleurothallis and the Orchidaceae family. It is also known as "The Dark Opening Pleurothallis".

Distribution 
Pleurothallis atrohiata  is native to Haiti. It is found on Massif de la Hotte at elevations of 800 meters.

Taxonomy 
It was described by Donald Dungan Dod in Moscosoa 5: 226, in 1989. 

Pleurothallis is a genus of orchids commonly called bonnet orchids.  This was a huge genus, which used to contain more than 1,200 species - the second largest in the Orchidaceae after Bulbophyllum.  

The genus name is derived from the Greek word pleurothallos, meaning "riblike branches". This refers to the rib-like stems of many species.

References 

atrohiata